Scaptesyle plumosus is a moth in the subfamily Arctiinae first described by Rothschild in 1912. It is found on Sumatra, Java, Peninsular Malaysia and Borneo. The habitat consists of coastal areas.

The forewing border is broad, enclosing deep red.

References

Lithosiini